Sandra Marie Schneiders, I.H.M. (born 12 November 1936), is professor emerita in the Jesuit School of Theology at the Graduate Theological Union in Berkeley, California.

She has published numerous works on spirituality, feminism, and theology.

In 2006, a volume of essays was published in her honor.

Also in 2006, she won the John Courtney Murray Award, the highest honor bestowed by the Catholic Theological Society of America.

Her education included
B.A. at Marygrove College, 
M.A. at University of Detroit,
S.T.L. at Institut Catholique de Paris,
S.T.D. at Pontifical Gregorian University.

Selected works
Selling All: Commitment, Consecrated Celibacy, and Community in Catholic Religious Life (2001)
Finding the Treasure: Locating Catholic Religious Life in a New Ecclesial and Cultural Context (2000)
With Oil in Their Lamps: Faith, Feminism, and the Future (2000)
Written That You May Believe: Encountering Jesus in the Fourth Gospel (2003)
The Revelatory Text: Interpreting the New Testament as Sacred Scripture (1999)
Jesus Risen in Our Midst: Essays on the Resurrection of Jesus in the Fourth Gospel (2013)
Women and the Word (1986)

References

External links
Faculty page (Sandra M. Schneiders)

1936 births
Living people
Pontifical Gregorian University alumni
Marygrove College alumni
University of Detroit Mercy alumni